O. fulgida may refer to:

 Opuntia fulgida, a cholla cactus
 Ovachlamys fulgida, a land snail